Niafunké is an album by Ali Farka Touré, released in 1999. The title reflects the name of the village in Mali where it was recorded. It is largely a traditional album concerning Mali.

Within the CD pamphlet Touré discusses his motivation for creating the album and how the music might relate to its audience.

Niafunké marks the first of a series of albums he recorded towards the end of his career in his home town. The album was released around the same time he retired to his farm in a remote region of Mali.

Track list

References

External links 
 Sampling the Sounds of Mali Without Leaving Home Short album description and sample of Tulumba.

1999 albums
Ali Farka Touré albums
World Circuit (record label) albums